Cowan High School is located in Cowan, Indiana in Southern Delaware County in east central Indiana. The school is located six miles south of downtown Muncie, Indiana. Current enrollment figures for Indiana rank Cowan High School 309th out of 345 total public schools. Cowan High school has a marching band but does not have a football team or a football field.

Athletics
The Blackhawks official colors are black and gold.

Affiliated with the Mid-Eastern Conference.

After the move to multi-class sports in 1997-1998, the Cowan girls volleyball team has played in the Class A State Finals twice (as of 2011). The Cowan girls volleyball team won the schools first class A State Championship title for the school in the year 2012.

Sports offered at Cowan include the following fall sports:  Girls and Boys cross country, bowling, girls volleyball, and girls and boys basketball.  The following spring sports are offered:  Boys baseball, girls softball, boys golf, and boys and girls track and field.

Clubs and organizations

Cowan High School has a number of clubs and extracurricular activities that are unrelated to athletics.  The following is a list of such groups:
 Student Council
 Key Club
 National Honors Society
 FCA (Fellowship of Christian Athletes)
 Campus Life

Notable alumni
 Justin O'Conner - A 2010 graduate, finished his high school baseball career with a state record-tying 51 career home runs and a state record 198 RBIs. O'Conner also was drafted in the first round of the Major League Baseball Draft by the Tampa Bay Rays.

See also
 List of high schools in Indiana
 Mid-Eastern Conference
 Muncie, Indiana

References

External links
 Official Website

Public high schools in Indiana
Schools in Delaware County, Indiana